Paul-André Durocher (born May 28, 1954) is a Canadian bishop of the Roman Catholic Church.

Life and career
Paul-André Durocher was born in Windsor, Ontario, on May 28, 1954. He was ordained a priest for the Roman Catholic Diocese of Timmins, Ontario, on July 2, 1982.

Pope John Paul II appointed Durocher Auxiliary Bishop of Sault Sainte Marie, Ontario, on January 20, 1997, and designated him as the titular bishop of Ausuaga. Durocher's episcopal consecration took place on March 14, 1997, with Bishop Jean-Louis Plouffe as the principal consecrator.

On April 27, 2002, Durocher was appointed Bishop of Alexandria-Cornwall, Ontario.

On October 12, 2011, Pope Benedict XVI appointed Durocher as Archbishop of Gatineau, Quebec. Archbishop Durocher was installed on November 30, 2011.  He participated in the Third Extraordinary General Assembly of the Synod of Bishops, where he advocated the ordination of women to the diaconate.

References

External links
Catholic-Hierarchy
Archdiocese of Gatineau (French)

1954 births
20th-century Roman Catholic bishops in Canada
21st-century Roman Catholic bishops in Canada
Living people
People from Windsor, Ontario
Roman Catholic archbishops of Gatineau
Roman Catholic bishops of Alexandria–Cornwall
Roman Catholic bishops of Sault Sainte Marie, Ontario